Shankar Trimbak Dharmadhikari (18 June 1899 – 1 December 1985), better known as Dada Dharmadhikari, was an Indian freedom fighter, and a leader of social reform movements in India. He was a strong adherent of Mahatma Gandhi's principles.

His elder son Yashwanth Shankar Dharmadhikari served as the Advocate-general of Madhya Pradesh and his younger son Chandrashekhar Shankar Dharmadhikari served as judge of Bombay High Court.

He died in Sevagram, Wardha on 1 December 1985.

See also
Gandhism
Sarvodaya

References

Indian independence activists from Madhya Pradesh
Betul, Madhya Pradesh
20th-century Indian philosophers
1899 births
1985 deaths
Gandhians
Members of the Constituent Assembly of India